is a railway station in the town of Yokohama, Kamikita District, Aomori Prefecture, Japan, operated by East Japan Railway Company (JR East).

Lines
Arihata Station is served by the Ōminato Line, and is located 36.0 kilometers from the terminus of the line at Noheji Station.

Station layout
The station has one ground-level side platform serving a single bidirectional track. There is no station building, but only a small rain shelter for passengers on the platform. The station is unattended.

History
Arihata Station was opened on June 10, 1946. With the privatization of the Japanese National Railways on April 1, 1987, it came under the operational control of JR East.

Surrounding area

Arihata Elementary School

External links

  

Railway stations in Aomori Prefecture
Ōminato Line
Railway stations in Japan opened in 1946
Yokohama, Aomori